Orette Bruce Golding (born 5 December 1947) is a former Jamaican politician who served as eighth Prime Minister of Jamaica from 11 September 2007 to 23 October 2011. He is a member of the Jamaica Labour Party (JLP), which he led from 2005 to his resignation in 2011.

Biography
He is the son of Tacius Golding and Enid Golding (née Bent), both teachers. Bruce was the third of four children: the second—the only girl—died shortly after birth. In 1949, when he was only two years old, his family moved to St. Faiths district near Browns Hall, St. Catherine, where he spent the next five years. In 1955, his mother accepted a teaching post at Alpha Academy in Kingston. This necessitated that the family relocate to Kingston.

As a child, Golding grew up in a political environment. He was only two years old in 1949 when his father was first elected as a Member of the House of Representatives for West St. Catherine, a seat that he retained for 22 years until his retirement in 1972. Tacius Golding was the first Speaker of the House in independent Jamaica and also served as Parliamentary Secretary in the Ministry of Housing.

Bruce Golding spent five years at St. George's College, and later transferred to Jamaica College to pursue A-Level studies. He entered the University of the West Indies (UWI) in 1966 and graduated in 1969 with a BSc degree in Economics (2nd-class Honours), majoring in public administration.

Golding was the chairman of the Jamaica Labour Party (JLP) before he and others felt the need to split and form a new party, the National Democratic Movement (NDM), in 1995. In 2002, he rejoined the JLP and in November 2003 was again elected chairman of the party.

He was elected leader of the JLP, and also the leader of the opposition, on 20 February 2005, succeeding Edward Seaga.

Bruce Golding represented three different constituencies as a Member of Parliament: West St. Catherine, Central St. Catherine, and Kingston West. While serving as Prime Minister, Golding and also hosted Jamaica House Live, a monthly talk show.

Prime Minister
Golding, as leader of the Jamaica Labour Party, became Prime Minister, following his party's slim victory in the 3 September 2007 general election and Prime Minister Portia Simpson-Miller's concession of defeat two days later. The JLP defeated the People's National Party by a narrow margin of 32 seats to 28, with a turnout of 61.46%. This election ended 18 years of PNP rule, and Golding became the new prime minister.

Golding was sworn in by the Governor-General of Jamaica on 11 September 2007. Golding was the nation's eighth prime minister since independence.

In April 2011, Bruce Golding said that Jamaica should break its ties with the British monarchy and become a republic. Speaking during a budget debate, Golding said that "transforming Jamaica from a monarchical to a republican state means no disrespect, and must not be interpreted this way".

Criminal Affiliate Accusation
An ABC Network article reported that Bruce Golding was a 'criminal affiliate of Christopher Coke
’. The article referred to a U.S government document to sustain its position. Golding categorically denied the accusation and this "U.S government document" has still not been produced.

Manatt, Phelps & Phillips and Christopher "Dudus" Coke extradition request

In a sitting of Parliament on 16 March 2010, Opposition member Dr. Peter Phillips made reference to an alleged contractual arrangement between the Government and a United States law firm Manatt, Phelps & Phillips to lobby the US Government on a treaty dispute between the two countries that had arisen as a result of the Jamaican Government refusing to sign an extradition request for Christopher 'Dudus' Coke, who is wanted in the US on charges relating to narcotics, arms and ammunition trafficking. The Golding Administration refused to sign the extradition request on the basis that the evidence was obtained contrary to Jamaican laws. Golding denied claims that Manatt, Phelps & Phillips was contracted to represent the Jamaican Government.

A US Justice Department filing under the Foreign Agents Registration Act (FARA) showed that Manatt, Phelps & Phillips had secured a contract worth US $400,000 to represent the Jamaican government in the treaty dispute. Karl Samuda, Minister of Industry, Investment and Commerce, made a statement in which he noted that unnamed members of the Jamaica Labour Party had approached Harold Brady, to see whether—through his wide network of international contacts—he could assist in facilitating the opening of discussions between the US authorities and the Government of Jamaica, and thereby seek to resolve what had become a treaty dispute between the US and Jamaica. In a statement made by Golding on 11 May 2010 in Parliament, he revealed that he had sanctioned the initiative to lobby the US Government but that the initiative was to be undertaken by the Jamaica Labour Party and not on behalf of the government.

Following his revelation, the Opposition People's National Party; its youth arm, the PNPYO; and the National Democratic Movement called for his resignation as Prime
Minister. Manatt, Phelps & Phillips maintains that they were contracted on behalf of the Jamaican Government through Harold C.W. Brady of Brady and Co and have since severed ties with the Jamaican Government.

On 17 May 2010, in a televised address to the nation, Golding apologised to the Jamaican people for his involvement in the Manatt affair. He stated that he was prepared to step aside as Prime Minister and leader of the Party in a meeting of the party executive. The executive rejected his offer and reassured their support for his role as party leader and Prime Minister. In his statement, he outlined new measures including assigning some of his portfolio responsibilities to other government Ministers, and a renewed thrust to enact legislation for: the impeachment of parliamentary members, term limits for the office of Prime Minister and political party finance reform. He also confirmed that Attorney General and Minister of Justice Dorothy Lightbourne will sign the authorisation for the US authorities to commence the extradition case against Christopher Coke.

State of emergency

Following the televised address, supporters of Christopher Coke began erecting barricades to the entrances of the Tivoli Gardens Community. This continued for several days as the security forces prepared to enter Tivoli Gardens to serve Coke with the warrant for his arrest. On 23 May 2010 police stations in and around downtown Kingston came under gunfire, and two were set ablaze and later burnt to the ground allegedly by supporters of Coke. Following the attack on the police forces, Golding initiated a state of public emergency on 23 May 2010, limited to the parishes of Kingston and St Andrew, giving the security forces extraordinary powers to maintain law and order. The Jamaica Constabulary Force and the Jamaica Defence Force mounted a joint operation to enter the community, with the objectives being to arrest Coke, clear the blockades, restore law and order and recover illegal guns believed to be in the community. The security forces met with armed resistance from thugs later discovered to be hired guns of Coke. The siege lasted for several days and left 73 civilians and 3 members of the security forces (2 JCF and 1 JDF) dead, 36 weapons and 9,241 rounds of ammunition recovered.

Vote of no confidence
Following the revelation that he had sanctioned the initiative for the Jamaica Labour Party to hire US lobbying firm Manatt, Phelps & Phillips and his handling of the extradition request for Christopher "Dudus" Coke, members and groups of civil society, church groups and political parties called for his resignation. With the backing of his party, the Prime Minister maintained that he would continue his term as Prime Minister. This prompted the opposition People's National Party to table a motion of no confidence. The opposition leader, Portia Simpson-Miller, led the debate in Parliament outlining the arguments for Golding's removal from office and moving that he be censured. The debate lasted for four hours, and at the end the motion was defeated 30–28, with members of the House of Representatives voting strictly on party lines.

Resignation
On 25 September 2011, Golding advised the JLP's Central Executive—the second highest decision-making body for the party outside the All-Island General Conference—of his intention not to seek re-election as Leader of the Jamaica Labour Party at the party's conference in November 2011 and, upon the election of a new party leader, his intention to step down as Prime Minister.

The Central Executive voted unanimously at its quarterly meeting at the party's Belmont Road headquarters on 25 September 2011, to reject Golding's resignation; however, words from the Information Minister Daryl Vaz, a close confidant of Golding, were that Golding's decision would remain, despite the rejection by the Central Executive.

Golding, in a brief written statement, said:

"The challenges of the last four years have taken their toll and it was appropriate now to make way for new leadership to continue the programmes of economic recovery and transformation, while mobilising the party for victory in the next general election."

LGBT
In May 2008, in an interview with Stephen Sackur of the BBC, he declared that any cabinet formed by him would exclude any MP known to be gay. In previous statements, Golding stated that he and his party strongly opposed public displays of homosexuality in Jamaica and that he felt that they should continue to be illegal in keeping with Jamaican societal norms. He justified the illegality of homosexual acts by referring to Christian values and the integrity of the family.

Personal life
Golding married Lorna Charles in 1972. They have three children: Sherene, Steven, and Ann-Merita. Golding practises Anglicanism.

See also

Cabinet of Jamaica

References

The Jamaica Gleaner. " Golden hour – Bruce takes office in Jamaica today ", The Jamaica Gleaner, 11 September 2007.

External links

Jamaica Information Service, Information Service of the Government of Jamaica
The Office of the Prime Minister 
Jamaica Labour Party – Bruce Golding
Bruce Golding on the BBC's HARDtalk Interview Program

1947 births
Jamaican Anglicans
Jamaica Labour Party politicians
Jamaican republicans
Living people
Members of the Privy Council of the United Kingdom
National Democratic Movement (Jamaica) politicians
Prime Ministers of Jamaica
University of the West Indies alumni